npm, Inc., is a company founded in 2014. It was acquired by GitHub, a subsidiary of Microsoft, in 2020. The company maintains the npm package manager for Node.js and the npm Registry, which hosts software packages and version control based on Git.

History
Bryan Bogensberger joined the company as CEO in July 2018 and resigned in September 2019. Before Bogensberger's resignation, npm co-founder Laurie Voss resigned in July 2019.

Microsoft-owned GitHub announced in March 2020 it would acquire npm, Inc.

References

2014 establishments in California
2020 mergers and acquisitions
GitHub
Microsoft acquisitions
Software companies established in 2014
Software companies based in the San Francisco Bay Area